Shadows (Macedonian: Сенки, Transliteration: Senki) is a 2007 film by the Academy-award nominated director Milcho Manchevski. Its motto is “Sometimes the Dead Speak Louder Than the Living”. Shadows, a Macedonian-German-Italian-Spanish-Bulgarian co-production was filmed on location in Skopje, Ohrid and several other locations in the Republic of Macedonia.

Plot

Lazar Perkov is the one man who’s got everything going for him. He’s young, good-looking, has a beautiful wife, lovely little boy, great house and a good job as a hospital physician. In fact, everyone calls him “Lucky.” Nothing’s missing – except maybe Lucky himself, who’s always trying to live up to the expectations of others. Like his bored wife and roguish colleagues. And, above all, his famous physician mother, a driven woman who rose from obscurity to renown with an iron will that crushed all resistance, whether from the living or the dead…

When Lucky is involved in a disastrous car crash and mysteriously saved from a sure death, his life begins to change. He meets strange people: an old man with a baby, an ancient lady speaking a forgotten dialect, a beautiful young woman with a sad secret. Their only message is: “Return what’s not yours. Have respect.” He gradually becomes aware that it is a message from the afterlife, from tormented souls who seem to die over and over again.

But why have they chosen him?

To answer this question, Lucky must finally grow up and become the man he wants to be.

The action begins at Lazar's home where he has a fight with his wife about how messed up his life was. Pissed off from the fight, he goes for a drive. When trying to light a cigarette in his car, without having the seatbelt on, his phone rings — it is his mother. Then the cigarette falls from his mouth in the desperate attempt to grab his mobile phone on the seat next to him, burning him on the arm. Now he loses control over the car, but meanwhile a woman is crossing the road. Lazar's attempt to avoid hitting her is fatal. His car flips, and crashes until he is found hanging off the car's window whose glass had broken in the crash. The slow movement on the car resting off a building's wall is threatening to crush his dangling head. As all of the people on the streets watch in despair, something moves him away from the car.

Cast

Production 
The film was written and directed by Milcho Manchevski, and produced by Mariela Besuievsky, Nermin Gladers, Dimitar Gochev, Gerardo Herrero, and Martin Husmann, Milcho Manchevski, Robert Jazadziski, Corinna Meaner, Elena Melamed, Amedeo Pagani, and Thomas Woodrow. Fabio Cianchetti was the director of photography, David Munns was the production designer, Marty Levenstein and David Ray edited the film, and the music was composed by Ryan Shore and  Kiril Džajkovski. Principal photography took place in Ohrid, Saramzalino and Skopje, Macedonia.

Awards

Macedonian Academy Award Submission, 2008: Best Foreign-Language Film
Golden Ladybug, 2008: Best Actress (Vesna Stanojevska in Shadows)
Golden Ladybug, 2008: Best Music Video (Jungle Shadow in Shadows)
Park City Film Music Festival, 2008: Gold Medal for Outstanding Achievement, Ryan Shore, composer
Syracuse Film Festival, 2008: Best Actress, Vesna Stanojevska in Shadows

Trailers

Soundtrack

The music was composed by Ryan Shore.

Critical reception
The film has premiered at several international film festivals, the first being the Toronto International Film Festival. The film was well received with one of the festival's film critics calling it "Manchevski’s most ambitious film to date". Other critics, such as Patrick McGavin of Screen Daily, called it “ambitious and capably mounted […] (Manchevski) retains a very fine eye for composition, aided by the sensuous, beautiful work of Italian cinematographer Fabio Cianchetti. The movie's standout quality is the sexy, revealing work of the vibrant, highly alluring young actress Vesna Stanojevska, a professional musician making her film debut. She injects the film with an erotic intensity”.

Rotten Tomatoes gave Shadows an average score of 60%, and an audience review of 58%. It had mixed reviews as a "respectable enough ghost story.." although, it was "bogged down with cliches".

IMDb audience gave shadows a 6.8 star rating, while critics gave it a score of 49 from metacritic.com

Stephen Holden from The New York Times, who gave it a score of 60 stated, "As Shadows vacillates between the historical and the occult, you may snicker at the way hackneyed horror movie conventions are redeployed for more serious ends. But you won't be bored. The movie is well acted (especially by Ms. Stanojevska) and very sexy."

The A.V. Club talks about, "It's a very sensual film, revelling in the pleasures of voyeurism.." The A.V. Club had mixed reviews, saying it was well-crafted, although one of his slight.

Release history

See also
List of films of the Republic of Macedonia

References

External links
 Bavaria Film International Website
 Stylus Magazine Review
 Stylus Magazine Review
 
 
Manchevski's Shadowsby Joe Bendel, J.B. Spins, January 2009
"Shadows" (review )by Andrew Schenker, January 28, 2009, Slant Magazine
Normalnost Balkana by Dragan Jurak, Feral Tribune, 23. 05. 2008 (in Croatian)
https://web.archive.org/web/20111003001052/http://www.popcornreel.com/htm/shadowsmilcho.htm
http://www.manchevski.com/docs/senki-sexuality%20and%20melancholy%20by%20katerina%20kolozova.pdf
https://web.archive.org/web/20120319054629/http://www.hollywoodtoday.net/2008/03/26/original-horror-twist-lurks-in-the-heart-of-%E2%80%9Cshadows%E2%80%9D/#more-4172
http://www.criticsnotebook.com/2009/02/shadows.html
http://www.politika.rs/rubrike/Kulturni-dodatak/Kubistichki-mozaik-istine.lt.html
http://www.crpm.org.mk/Papers/MilcoManchevski.htm

2007 films
Macedonian drama films
Articles containing video clips